Shafqat Rasool (born 10 December 1988, Toba Tek Singh) is a Pakistani field hockey player. On 3 April 2021, he was banned from all competition for 10 years after "indulged in a fight during a match."

Career

2008 
Rasool was part of the Pakistan squad at the 2008 Olympics, playing in all 6 of Pakistan's games and scoring 1 goal.

2010
Rasool took part in the 2010 Commonwealth Games in New Delhi, India. Late in November, he was part of the gold medal winning team at the Asian Games in Guangzhou, China.

2012 
Rasool played in all of Pakistan's games at the 2012 Summer Olympics, again scoring 1 goal.

References

Living people
1988 births
People from Toba Tek Singh District
Pakistani male field hockey players
Field hockey players at the 2008 Summer Olympics
Field hockey players at the 2012 Summer Olympics
Olympic field hockey players of Pakistan
Field hockey players at the 2010 Commonwealth Games
Commonwealth Games competitors for Pakistan
Field hockey players at the 2010 Asian Games
Field hockey players at the 2014 Asian Games
Field hockey players at the 2018 Asian Games
Asian Games gold medalists for Pakistan
Asian Games silver medalists for Pakistan
Asian Games medalists in field hockey
Medalists at the 2010 Asian Games
Medalists at the 2014 Asian Games